The New York–Penn League Hall of Fame is an American baseball hall of fame which honors players, managers, and executives of the New York–Penn League of Minor League Baseball for their accomplishments or contributions to the league in playing or administrative roles. The Hall of Fame inducted its first class in 2012. As of 2018, 27 individuals have been inducted into the New York–Penn League Hall of Fame.

Table key

Inductees

References

External links
Official website

Hall
Minor league baseball museums and halls of fame
Minor league baseball trophies and awards
Awards established in 2012